Pramodita Sharma is a business academic. She is the a professor and the Schlesinger-Grossman Chair of Family Business at the Grossman School of Business (GSB), University of Vermont. Sharma was editor-in-chief of the Family Business Review.

Education 
Sharma completed a Ph.D. at the University of Calgary. Her 1997 dissertation was titled Determinants of the satisfaction of the primary stakeholders with the succession process in family firms. James J. Chrisman was her doctoral advisor. Sharma is married to Sanjay Sharma. Both Sharma and her husband independently won the National Federation of Independent Business dissertation award for outstanding research in the entrepreneurship-independent business category.

Career 
Sharma is a professor and the Schlesinger-Grossman Chair of Family Business at the Grossman School of Business (GSB), University of Vermont. She is a visiting professor at Kellogg School of Management and a senior research fellow at the Indian School of Business. She was editor-in-chief of the Family Business Review.

Sharma researches succession, governance, and innovation in family businesses. She also investigates how family business decisions are impacted by spirituality, philanthropy, and sustainability.

Awards and honors 
Sharma holds honorary doctorates at Jönköping University and Martin Luther University of Halle-Wittenberg.

Selected works

References

External links 

 
 

Living people
Year of birth missing (living people)
Place of birth missing (living people)
Canadian women academics
University of Vermont faculty
University of Calgary alumni
21st-century women writers
21st-century non-fiction writers
20th-century births